

Lady of Bourbon

House of Bourbon, 950–1218

House of Dampierre, 1228–1288

House of Burgundy, 1288–1310 
None

Capetian House of Clermont, 1310–1327

Duchess of Bourbon

First Creation

Capetian House of Bourbon, 1327–1523

Second Creation

House of Savoy, 1523–1531 
None

Third Creation

House of Valois-Angoulême, 1544–1545
None

Fourth Creation

House of Valois-Angoulême, 1566–1574
None

Fifth Creation

House of Bourbon, 1661–1830

Notes

Sources

 
consorts
Bourbon, consorts